Yarrawonga  is a town in the Shire of Moira local government area in the Australian state of Victoria. Yarrawonga's twin town of Mulwala is on the other side of the Murray River.

Yarrawonga is served by a standard gauge branch railway, which branches off the Melbourne-Sydney line at Benalla and terminates at Oaklands in New South Wales.

Yarrawonga's main attraction is Lake Mulwala, formed by the damming of the Murray River.  The lake is a popular location for activities such as boating, kayaking and fishing. There are two crossings of the Murray between Yarrawonga and Mulwala; across the weir (a stock route carrying a single lane of traffic); and a bridge over Lake Mulwala.  This bridge contains an unusual bend and dip in the middle, a result of miscommunication between the two state governments.

The Yarrawonga Football Club (the 'Mighty Pigeons') participates in the Ovens and Murray Football League in the sport of Australian rules football, which has produced Barry Mitchell, Joel Smith, Ben Dixon, and Tom Lonergan.

History
Yarrawonga Post Office opened on 28 November 1874.

Historically, one of the major industries in the Yarrawonga/Mulwala area has been the explosives factory, which was constructed in Mulwala over 1942–43. It is now operated by French company Thales but remains an Australian Department of Defence asset.

The Yarrawonga Magistrates' Court closed on 1 January 1990.

Climate

Popular culture
 Niel McBeath wrote the song "I'm Going Back Again to Yarrawonga", published in 1919 and later recorded by Ella Shields and Leonard Hubbard in 1992 and 1996.

Gallery

See also
 Yarrawonga Airport

References

External links
 Local history of Yarrawonga
 Moira Shire Council – Official website
 Yarrawonga – Mulwala tourism
 Yarrawonga Railway Station & Silos

Towns in Victoria (Australia)
Shire of Moira
Populated places on the Murray River